The 1970–71 ABA season was the fourth season of the American Basketball Association.  

Notable franchise moves from the previous season included:

 The Washington Caps moved to Norfolk, Virginia, became the Virginia Squires and switched divisions with the Indiana Pacers.
 The Miami Floridians became more of a regional franchise and were re-named simply The Floridians.
 The Los Angeles Stars moved to Salt Lake City, Utah, and became the Utah Stars.
 The Dallas Chaparrals became a regional franchise and were re-named the Texas Chaparrals.
 The New Orleans Buccaneers moved to Memphis, Tennessee, and became the Memphis Pros.

The Utah Stars, led by Zelmo Beaty and Willie Wise, won the ABA championship, defeating the Kentucky Colonels, 4 games to 3, in the ABA Finals.

Standings

Eastern Division

Western Division

Asterisk (*) denotes playoff team (the Rockets and the Chaparrals played a one game playoff to settle the tie for the final playoff spot, which the Chaparrals won)

Bold – ABA Champions

Playoffs

Awards and honors

 ABA Most Valuable Player Award: Mel Daniels, Indiana Pacers (2nd time)
 Rookie of the Year: Charlie Scott, Virginia Squires & Dan Issel, Kentucky Colonels
 Coach of the Year: Al Bianchi, Virginia Squires
 Playoffs MVP: Zelmo Beaty, Utah Stars
 All-Star Game MVP: Mel Daniels, Indiana Pacers
All-ABA First Team 
 Roger Brown, Indiana Pacers (1st First Team selection, 3rd overall selection)
 Rick Barry, New York Nets (3rd selection)
 Mel Daniels, Indiana Pacers (4th selection)
 Mack Calvin, The Floridians
 Charlie Scott, Virginia Squires
All-ABA Second Team
 John Brisker, Pittsburgh Condors
 Joe Caldwell, Carolina Cougars
 Zelmo Beaty, Utah Stars (tied with Issel)
 Dan Issel, Kentucky Colonels (tied with Beaty)
 Donnie Freeman, Texas Chaparrals (3rd selection)
 Larry Cannon, Denver Rockets
All-ABA Rookie Team
 Joe Hamilton, Texas Chaparrals
 Dan Issel, Kentucky Colonels
 Wendell Ladner, Memphis Pros
 Samuel Robinson, The Floridians
 Charlie Scott, Virginia Squires

References

External links

1970-71 ABA Season Summary | Basketball-Reference.com

 
ABA